Mark Alan Mullaney (born April 30, 1953) is a former professional American football defensive end in the National Football League. He was selected by the Minnesota Vikings in the 1st round (25th overall) of the 1975 NFL Draft. Mullaney attended Colorado State where he played on both offensive line and defensive line. He played in 12 NFL seasons from 1975 to 1987 for the Vikings and is 9th on the Vikings  all-time sack list with 45½ sacks. Mullaney also had 597 tackles and 13 forced fumbles  
Mullaney also holds a place in NFL history as the first NFL Player to wear a helmet shield visor on his face mask, after suffering an eye injury in 1984.  In 1986 Mullaney switched to a dark tinted shield, the first player to wear this as well.  Dennis Ryan, the Vikings long time equipment manager, helped Mullaney create the shield(s).

References

1953 births
Living people
Players of American football from Denver
American football defensive ends
Colorado State Rams football players
Minnesota Vikings players